Adrien Louveau (born 1 February 2000) is a French professional footballer who plays as a defender for Lens II.

Club career 
Adrien Louveau arrived in RC Lens as a youngster in 2009, signing his first professional contract in March 2021, after having already figured several times in the first team squad.

He made his professional debut for Lens on the 18 April 2021, coming on as an 83rd-minute substitute of Gaël Kakuta in the 1–1 Ligue 1 away draw against Brest.

References

External links

2000 births
Living people
French footballers
Footballers from Lille
Association football defenders
RC Lens players
Ligue 1 players
Championnat National 2 players